Tianzhou 3 was a mission of the Tianzhou-class uncrewed cargo spacecraft, launched on 20 September 2021, at 07:10:11 UTC. Like previous Tianzhou missions, the spacecraft was launched from Wenchang Satellite Launch Center in Hainan, China on a Long March 7 launch vehicle. 

Tianzhou 3 was the second cargo resupply mission to the Tianhe core module (TCM) of the under-construction Tiangong space station, carrying over six tons of supplies. The spacecraft successfully docked at the TCM's aft port seven hours after launch at 14:08 UTC.

On 20 April 2022, Tianzhou 3 successfully relocated itself from Tianhe's aft port to the forward port to make the aft port available for docking by Tianzhou 4. On 17 July it was undocked for deorbiting, making way for the installation of the Wentian module. It reentered the Earth's atmosphere and burned up as planned on 27 July 2022.

Spacecraft 

The Tianzhou cargo ship has several notable differences with the Tiangong stations from which it is derived. It has only three segments of solar panels (against 4 for Tiangong), but has 4 maneuvering engines (against 2).

References 

Tiangong program
Tianzhou (spacecraft)
Spacecraft launched in 2021
Spacecraft which reentered in 2022
2021 in China